John Caspar Dreier (December 27, 1906 – March 10, 1994) was an American diplomat and teacher.

He served as United States Ambassador to the Organization of American States (OAS) between 1951 and 1960. He then taught for a number of years at the School of Advanced International Studies (part of Johns Hopkins University in Washington, D.C.).

Biography 
Born in Brooklyn, New York City, Dreier attended Harvard College. He began working for the Department of State in 1941. In this role, he witnessed the Bogotazo riots in Bogotá, Colombia in 1948. Appointed to be Ambassador to the OAS by President Harry S. Truman, he served from January 2, 1951 until November 12, 1960. Dreier primarily saw the OAS as a way to limit the spread of communism in Latin America during the Cold War, with his tenure including events such as the 1954 Guatemalan coup d'état and the Cuban Revolution. Furthermore, he believed that the OAS needed to address social and economic concerns in order to succeed.

Dreier retired in 1972. After retirement, he played an active role as a teacher and trustee of the College of the Atlantic in Bar Harbor, Maine, and was involved in conservation projects. Two annual scholarships exist at the College in honor of him and his wife.

Personal life 
Dreier was married to Louisa Cabot Richardson Dreier for 51 years and had three children. He died in Cambridge, Massachusetts of complications resulting from congestive heart failure.

Publications
Organization of American States and the Hemisphere Crisis (Harper & Row, 1962)
The Alliance for Progress: Problems and Perspectives (Editor) (Johns Hopkins University Press, 1962)
International Organization in the Western Hemisphere (Co-author) (Syracuse University Press, 1968).

References 

1906 births
1994 deaths
Paul H. Nitze School of Advanced International Studies alumni
Permanent Representatives of the United States to the Organization of American States
College of the Atlantic faculty
Harvard College alumni